This is a list of the 130 departments, the conventional name for the administrative subdivisions of the First French Empire at the height of its territorial extent, circa 1811.

Note that the Illyrian Provinces were also part of France, but were not organised into departments, and so are not included in this list. Similarly, four additional French departments were also created in Catalonia (annexed from Spain in 1812); their juridical status remained incomplete until the French lost their grip on Spain in 1814. Those departments were: Bouches-de-l'Èbre, Montserrat, Sègre, and Ter.

List

The names of departments formed from territories annexed to France after 1791 have been colour-coded as follows:

Moreover, the Tanaro department was established in 1802 and disbanded in 1805; it was one of the six original départments which took the place of the Subalpine Republic. Its territory was divided between the three départments of Marengo, Stura, and Montenotte (the latter was created after the annexation of the Ligurian Republic).

External links
Descriptions of the departments in French

Former departments of France
Subdivisions of the First French Empire